The 1961–62 NCAA University Division men's basketball season began in December 1961, progressed through the regular season and conference tournaments, and concluded with the 1962 NCAA University Division basketball tournament championship game on March 24, 1962, at Freedom Hall in Louisville, Kentucky. The Cincinnati Bearcats won their second NCAA national championship with a 71–59 victory over the Ohio State Buckeyes.

Season headlines 

 The Associated Press (AP) Poll changed format, abandoning the Top 20 format it had used since its inception in the 1948–49 season and becoming a Top 10 poll.
 Cincinnati's national championship was its second in a row as well as second overall, and the national championship game was a rematch from the year before between Cincinnati and Ohio State.
 The 1962 NCAA University Division basketball tournament set a new attendance record for an NCAA tournament, with a combined 177,469 fans attending its 29 games.
 The Border Conference and Skyline Conference both disbanded at the end of the season.

Season outlook

Pre-season polls 

The Top 10 from the AP Poll and the UPI Coaches Poll during the pre-season.

Regular season

Conference winners and tournaments

Informal championships

Statistical leaders

Post-season tournaments

NCAA tournament

Final Four 

 Third Place – Wake Forest 82, UCLA 80

National Invitation tournament

Semifinals & finals 

 Third Place – Loyola-Chicago 95, Duquesne 84

Awards

Consensus All-American teams

Major player of the year awards 

 Helms Player of the Year: Paul Hogue, Cincinnati
 Associated Press Player of the Year:Jerry Lucas, Ohio State
 UPI Player of the Year: Jerry Lucas, Ohio State
 Oscar Robertson Trophy (USBWA):Jerry Lucas, Ohio State
 Sporting News Player of the Year: Jerry Lucas, Ohio State

Major coach of the year awards 

 Henry Iba Award: Fred Taylor, Ohio State
 NABC Coach of the Year: Fred Taylor, Ohio State
 UPI Coach of the Year: Fred Taylor, Ohio State

Other major awards 

 Robert V. Geasey Trophy (Top player in Philadelphia Big 5): Hubie White, Villanova
 NIT/Haggerty Award (Top player in New York City metro area): LeRoy Ellis, St. John's

Coaching changes 

A number of teams changed coaches during the season and after it ended.

References